Dunmow may refer to:

Great Dunmow, a town in the Uttlesford district of Essex, England
Dunmow railway station, a disused station
John Dunmow, a Canon of Windsor
Little Dunmow, a village located about 3 miles outside the town of Great Dunmow